Hume's white-eye (Zosterops auriventer) is a bird species in the family Zosteropidae. It is found in upland areas of Myanmar, southern Thailand, the Malay Peninsula and Borneo.

This species was formerly treated as a subspecies of the Indian white-eye (Zosterops palpebrosus). Based on a study published as two articles in 2017, it was promoted to species rank. Included as subspecies are two taxa that were previously treated as subspecies of Everett's white-eye (Zosterops everetti).

There are four subspecies:
 Z. a. auriventer Hume, 1878 – southeast Myanmar (Tenasserim Hills)
 Z. a. tahanensis (Ogilvie-Grant, 1906) – central and south Malay Peninsula
 Z. a. wetmorei (Deignan, 1943) – south Thailand, north Malay Peninsula
 Z. a. medius Robinson & Kloss, 1923 – Borneo

References

Hume's white-eye
Birds of Southeast Asia
Hume's white-eye